Geoff Swaim (born September 16, 1993) is an American football tight end for the Tennessee Titans of the National Football League (NFL). He played college football at Texas and was drafted in the seventh round of the 2015 NFL Draft by the Dallas Cowboys. Swaim has also played for the Jacksonville Jaguars.

Early years
Swaim attended Pleasant Valley High School, where he played high school football. He played linebacker and received All-section and All-league honors as a senior, after registering 124 tackles (65 solo), 6 sacks, one interception, one fumble recovery and 2 blocked extra points. He also participated in basketball.

College career
Swaim enrolled Butte College where he was converted to tight end and was a two-year starter, helping the team win back-to-back bowls and the 2012 Nor Cal Conference Championship.

After his sophomore season, Swaim transferred to the University of Texas where he was a two-year starter, being used mostly as a blocking tight end and on special teams. Swaim finished with 22 starts out of 26 games, 13 receptions for 84 yards and one touchdown.

Collegiate statistics

Professional career

Dallas Cowboys

2015 season: Rookie year
Swaim was selected by the Dallas Cowboys in the seventh round with the 246th overall pick in the 2015 NFL Draft. The Cowboys traded their sixth round pick (178th overall) in the 2016 NFL Draft to the San Francisco 49ers in exchange for a seventh round pick after it became apparent Swaim was considering signing with the San Diego Chargers if he had become an undrafted free agent. Swaim was the 17th tight end drafted in 2015. 

Swaim played well enough in the preseason to force the team to make the unusual of move of keeping four tight ends. As a rookie, he was declared inactive for 12 games, while playing in four games. Swaim had one start against the New England Patriots, when he replaced an injured James Hanna and the Cowboys opened in a three-tight end set. The season-ending injury to Gavin Escobar gave him a chance to play in the last two games and record one reception for no yards.

2016 season
Swaim became the backup and blocking tight end after James Hanna missed the season with a knee bone bruise. Swaim started the season opener against the New York Giants as the second tight end. He started in the ninth game against the Pittsburgh Steelers as the second tight end, but suffered a pectoral injury and was replaced by Gavin Escobar. On November 16, Swaim was placed on the injured reserve list with a pectoral tear. He finished the season with six receptions for 69 yards in nine games and six starts.

2017 season

Swaim missed part of the offseason due to a foot fracture he suffered during a personal workout. Swaim was the third-string tight end behind James Hanna. Swaim was declared inactive against the Atlanta Falcons due to a knee injury he suffered in practice. He finished the season with two receptions for 25 yards in 15 games and two starts.

2018 season
Swaim entered the season as the Cowboys starting tight end after the sudden retirements of Jason Witten and Hanna. During a Week 3 24-13 road loss to the Seattle Seahawks, he had a career-high five receptions for a then career-high 47 yards. In the next game against the Detroit Lions, Swaim scored his first NFL touchdown on a one-yard reception from Dak Prescott. Swaim finished the 26-24 victory with five receptions for 39 yards and the aforementioned touchdown. The following week against the Houston Texans, he had a career-high 55 receiving yards in the 19-16 overtime road loss.

Swaim started nine games before suffering a broken bone in his wrist during Week 11 against the Atlanta Falcons. He missed the next four games before being placed on injured reserve on December 22.

Swaim was used mostly for blocking purposes, finishing the season with a then-career-high 26 receptions for 242 yards and a touchdown. He was a solid blocking tight end during his time with the Cowboys. However, Swaim's development was limited by injuries.

Jacksonville Jaguars
On March 15, 2019, Swaim was signed by the Jacksonville Jaguars. 

Swaim began the season as the backup behind James O'Shaughnessy. On October 22, Swaim was placed on injured reserve with an ankle injury and a concussion. He appeared in just six games with two starts (when the team opened in a two tight ends formation), posting 13 receptions for 65 yards.

On March 17, 2020, Swaim was released by the Jaguars.

Tennessee Titans

2020 season
On August 19, 2020, Swaim was signed by the Tennessee Titans, to compete for the blocking tight end role with MyCole Pruitt. Swaim was declared inactive for the first three games of the season. The Titans experienced a serious COVID-19 outbreak in Week 4, which opened the door for Swaim to start in Week 6 against the Buffalo Bills. During a Week 13 31-10 road victory over the Jacksonville Jaguars, Swaim caught three passes for 34 yards and a touchdown. His second NFL touchdown came on a 5-yard reception from Ryan Tannehill.

Swaim appeared in 10 games with eight starts and ended up playing the second-most snaps among the tight ends. He collected nine receptions for 83 yards and a touchdown.

2021 season
On March 17, 2021, Swaim re-signed with the Titans on a one-year deal. With the departure of Jonnu Smith in free agency, Swaim was named the starting tight end to begin the season.

During a Week 8 34-31 overtime road victory over the Indianapolis Colts, Swaim caught five passes for 23 yards and his first touchdown of the season. In the next game, Swaim caught four passes for 29 yards and a touchdown as the Titans beat the Los Angeles Rams on the road by a score of 28-16. During a Week 17 34-3 victory over the Miami Dolphins, Swaim caught his third touchdown of the season.

Swaim finished the season with a career-high 31 receptions for 210 yards and three touchdowns.

2022 season
On March 14, 2022, Swaim signed a one-year contract extension with the Titans.

NFL statistics

Regular season

Postseason

Personal life
Swaim's brother, Mycal, was a part of the 2014 preseason roster, as a defensive back for the Tampa Bay Buccaneers. Mycal attended college and played NCAA football at Eastern Michigan University.

References

External links
Texas Longhorns bio
Tennessee Titans bio

1993 births
Living people
Sportspeople from Chico, California
Players of American football from California
American football tight ends
Butte Roadrunners football players
Texas Longhorns football players
Dallas Cowboys players
Jacksonville Jaguars players
Tennessee Titans players